"Holding You" is a song by New Zealand singer-songwriter Ginny Blackmore and Australian–New Zealand recording artist Stan Walker. It was released as a single by Sony Music Entertainment on 4 April 2014.

Background and release
"Holding You" was written by Blackmore and Walker. According to Walker, he wrote the second verse about his girlfriend, and called the song "a real hearty story about love and how grateful and lucky we are to have that person in our life." "Holding You" was released as a digital download by Sony Music Entertainment on 4 April 2014. A three-track download was released on 18 April 2014. In Australia, "Holding You" was released as a 5-track download and compact disc single on 13 June 2014.

Reception
"Holding You" debuted atop the New Zealand Singles Chart of 14 April 2014, becoming the second number-one single on the chart for both Blackmore and Walker. In its fifth week on the chart, the single was certified gold by Recorded Music NZ for selling 7,500 copies, and was certified platinum in September 2014. It entered the Australian Singles Chart at number forty-three on 29 June 2014.

Music video
The music video for "Holding You" was directed by Jessica Sanderson, and premiered on Stuff.co.nz on 10 April 2014. Sanderson created the video around the Māori mythology creation story of Rangi and Papa; in the video, Walker represents the Earth while Blackmore represents the sky.

Live performances
Blackmore and Walker performed "Holding You" in Queenstown, New Zealand on 19 June 2014. The performance was broadcast live on Australian breakfast television show Sunrise, as part of its first live New Zealand broadcast which coincided with the fortieth anniversary of the Queenstown Winter Festival.

Formats and track listings

NZ digital download
"Holding You" – 3:39

NZ maxi download
"Holding You" – 3:39
"Holding You" (acoustic version) – 3:52
"I Can't Make You Love Me" – 3:57

Australian download and CD single
"Holding You" – 3:39
"Holding You" (acoustic version) – 3:52
"I Can't Make You Love Me" – 3:57
"Black Box"
"Take It Easy" (alternate version)

Charts

Weekly charts

Year-end charts

Certifications

See also
List of number-one singles from the 2010s (New Zealand)

References

External links

2014 singles
Stan Walker songs
Ginny Blackmore songs
Male–female vocal duets
Sony Music Australia singles
2014 songs
Songs written by Ginny Blackmore
Songs written by Stan Walker